My Tutor Friend 2 (lit. "Tutoring a Friend of My Age Lesson 2") is a 2007 South Korean romantic comedy film released on April 19, 2007.

It was promoted as a sequel to the 2003 movie My Tutor Friend, but the films' characters and plots are unrelated, and only share the basic premise of a boy and girl of the same age that happen to meet as student and tutor, and later fall in love.

Plot

Cast
 Lee Chung-ah - Junko
 Park Ki-woong - Jong-man
 Lee Young-ha - Heo Ha-ryong
 Yoon Young-sam - Sung Moon-ran
 Julian Quintart - George
 Jo Dal-hwan - Seon Poong-gi
 Jang Young-ran - assistant teacher Hee-jung
 Yang Geum-seok - Dong-wook's mother
 Baek Seung-woo - Lee Dong-wook
 Yang Jin-woo - Jung Woo-sung
 Shin Cheol-jin - Professor
 Choi Il-hwa - Junko's father
 Ah Yong-joo - gang boss
 Shin Jung-geun - film professor
 Jung Jae-hoon - gunman
 Jung Eun-woo - Woo-sung's friend
 Shin Cheol-jin - Professor
 Lee Jooyeon - Azumi
 Kim Tan-hyun - cop 1
 Kim Kwang-sik - drunk man 1
 Jung Dae-yong - drunk man 2
 Lee Won - wine bar employee

References

External links
 
 
 

2007 films
2000s Korean-language films
2007 romantic comedy films
South Korean sequel films
South Korean romantic comedy films
2000s South Korean films

ja:同い年の家庭教師